Alois Reiser (April 6, 1887 – April 4, 1977) was an American cellist and composer. Born in Prague, he came to the United States in 1905.  He composed a number of works for orchestra, including two tone poems and two cello concertos; he also wrote chamber music, including string quartets, and the opera Gobi.  He also composed music for films.

He died in Los Angeles.

Selected filmography
 Hard to Get (1929)
 The Hottentot (1929)
 Her Private Life (1929)
 The Isle of Lost Ships (1929)
 The Lady Who Dared (1931)

References

External links

1887 births
1977 deaths
American male classical composers
American classical composers
American opera composers
Male opera composers
Austro-Hungarian emigrants to the United States
20th-century American male musicians